Jonathan Mark Wilson (born 9 July 1976) is a British sports journalist and author who writes for a number of publications, including The Guardian and Sports Illustrated. He is a columnist for World Soccer and Unibet and founder and editor of The Blizzard. He also appears on The Guardians football podcast, Football Weekly".

Biography 
Wilson studied English at Oxford University and was sports editor of the student paper, The Oxford Student. He was unable to continue on to postgraduate studies at Oxford after failing to attain a first-class degree and instead read for a Master's degree at Durham University, where he was a member of the Graduate Society.

Wilson has written for The Independent, FourFourTwo magazine and The Daily Telegraph, and was football correspondent for the Financial Times from 2002 to 2006. He writes for The Guardian and Sports Illustrated and is a columnist for World Soccer.

In 2011 he founded the quarterly football journal The Blizzard, which he edits.

Wilson was the main contributor to a feature on The Guardian website, "The Question", in which he analyzes modern trends and evolutions in football. "The Question" has included articles on the decline of the box-to-box midfielder, the importance of the modern full-back and the evolution of the defensive striker. He is currently the main football columnist for The Observer.

His book, Inverting the Pyramid was shortlisted for the William Hill Sports Book of the Year in 2008, and won 'Best Football Book' at the British Sports Book Awards in 2009. Five of his other books have also been shortlisted for the award. Inverting the Pyramid also won the Premio Antonio Ghirelli and was shortlisted for the German football book of the year award.

His book, "Angels with Dirty Faces" won "Best Football Book" and "Best Historical Book" at the Polish Sports Book Awards (Sportowa Książka Roku) in 2018.

He won FSA Football Writer of the Year in 2012, 2017 and 2021.

Personal life 
He supports Sunderland A.F.C. in football.
 He plays cricket on the Authors XI team with other British writers. He resides in Wandsworth, South London.

Books 
 Behind The Curtain: Travels in Eastern European Football (2006)
 Sunderland: A Club Transformed (2007)
 Inverting the Pyramid: The History of Football Tactics (2008)
 The Anatomy of England (2010)
 Brian Clough: Nobody Ever Says Thank You: The Biography (2011)
 The Outsider: A History of the Goalkeeper (2012)
 The Anatomy of Liverpool (2013)
 Angels With Dirty Faces: The Footballing History of Argentina (2016)
 The Anatomy of Manchester United: A History in Ten Matches (2017)
 The Barcelona Legacy: Guardiola, Mourinho and the Fight For Football's Soul (2018)
 The Names Heard Long Ago: How the Golden Age of Hungarian Football Shaped the Modern Game (2019)
 Two Brothers: The Life and Lives of Bobby and Jackie Charlton (2022)

References

External links 
 Jonathan Wilson's profile at Guardian.co.uk
 The Question Column
 Review of "Inverting the Pyramid"

Living people
English podcasters
People from Sunderland
Writers from Tyne and Wear
The Guardian journalists
British male journalists
British sports journalists
English sportswriters
1976 births
English male non-fiction writers
Alumni of the University of Oxford
Alumni of Durham University Graduate Society